Marc Avellin Reaume (born February 7, 1934) is a Canadian former professional ice hockey defenceman who played 344 games in the National Hockey League. He played with the Toronto Maple Leafs, Detroit Red Wings, Montreal Canadiens, and Vancouver Canucks, as well as for several teams in the minor American Hockey League in a career that lasted from 1954 until 1971.

Career statistics

Regular season and playoffs

External links 

1934 births
Canadian ice hockey defencemen
Detroit Red Wings players
Hershey Bears players
Living people
Montreal Canadiens players
People from Essex County, Ontario
Pittsburgh Hornets players
Rochester Americans players
St. Michael's Buzzers players
Toronto Maple Leafs players
Toronto St. Michael's Majors players
Tulsa Oilers (1964–1984) players
Vancouver Canucks players
Vancouver Canucks (WHL) players